Josef Friedrich Schmidt (24 November 1871 – 28 September 1948) was a German board game inventor.

Schmidt was the inventor of board game Mensch ärgere Dich nicht. He invented the game in 1907/1908.

See also 
 Schmidt Spiele

German inventors
1871 births
1948 deaths
Board game designers
20th-century German inventors